Nova Era is a Brazilian municipality located in the state of Minas Gerais. The city belongs to the mesoregion of Belo Horizonte and to the microregion of Itabira.  As of 2020, the estimated population was 17,551.

See also
 List of municipalities in Minas Gerais

References

Municipalities in Minas Gerais